Elizabeth South is a northern suburb of Adelaide, South Australia in the City of Playford.

It was established in the late 1950s as one of the earliest residential suburbs of the planned City of Elizabeth. As for its neighbours including Elizabeth and Elizabeth North, it was configured as a local community around a small shopping centre containing a supermarket, bank, hotel and service station along with other shops.

The western boundary is the Gawler railway line, with predominantly current and former Defence land on the other side, including the South Australian branch of the Defence Science and Technology Group opposite Elizabeth South railway station. The suburb is situated on both sides of Philip Highway. The northern part of the suburb (north of Hogarth Road) is a residential suburb, with corresponding schools, shops and other community services. South of Hogarth Road, the suburb is industrial, including automotive and Defence manufacturing, dominated by the large Holden factory, which opened in 1960 and closed in 2017.

It was built around 1940 (before Elizabeth was established) to supply the munitions factory that is now repurposed as Defence Science and Technology.

Population

According to the 2016 census of Population, there were 2,864 people in Elizabeth South.
 Aboriginal and Torres Strait Islander people made up 6.5% of the population. 
 63.7% of people were born in Australia. The next most common country of birth was England at 6.3%.   
 71.4% of people spoke only English at home. 
 The most common response for religion was No Religion at 38.4%.

References

Suburbs of Adelaide